Renato Casaro (born 26 October 1935) is an Italian artist known for his movie posters, which include films like My Name Is Nobody, Quadrophenia, Conan the Barbarian, Tenebrae, Octopussy, Never Say Never Again, Rambo: First Blood Part II (Int'l Version), Red Sonja and Flesh and Blood. He is considered one of the most important, influential and innovative Italian film poster artists. He has made hundreds of works dedicated to the cinema, becoming very popular abroad. He has also painted calendars, collectibles, book covers and album covers.

Early life
Renato Casaro was born on 26 October 1935 in Treviso. His early interest in posters reportedly began with movie advertisements. He would go every day to the cinema to see if they were changing the posters, and if they were he would ask if he could take them home where he would try to reproduce them. In 1953, at age 18, Renato found a job as a staff artist at Studio Favalli, a famous design and art studio of Rome's film industry. In Rome, at age 21, Renato opened his own art studio.

Career
Dino De Laurentiis hired Casaro in 1965 to design the poster images for the film The Bible: In the Beginning.... After that, Casaro worked on many films with De Laurentiis, like Flash Gordon, Dune and Conan the Barbarian. In the same time Casaro continued his business, producing posters for different directors like Sergio Leone, Claude Lelouch, Francis Ford Coppola, Bernardo Bertolucci, Luc Besson, Franco Zeffirelli and Rainer Werner Fassbinder.

In 2019, Casaro was called by Quentin Tarantino to realize some "old school illustrated Western posters" ("Uccidimi Subito Ringo, disse il Gringo" aka "Kill Me Now Ringo, Said The Gringo" and "Nebraska Jim") for Italian films starring Rick Dalton, the character Leonardo DiCaprio plays in Once Upon a Time in Hollywood.

Selected film posters
 The Adventures of Baron Munchausen (1988)
 Army of Darkness (1992)
 Conan the Barbarian (1982)
 Dune (1984)
 Fire, Ice and Dynamite (1990)
 Flesh and Blood (1985)
 Memoirs of an Invisible Man (1992)
 My Name Is Nobody (1973)
 The NeverEnding Story II: The Next Chapter (1990)
 Over the Top (1987)
 Red Sonja (1985)

Published collections
 Renato Casaro: Africa 
 Renato Casaro - Movie Art 
 Renato Casaro - Painted Movies 
 African Memories 
 Renato Casaro - The art of movie painting

Awards
 1988 Ciak d'oro best movie poster - Opera "An interview with Renato Casaro"
 1991 Ciak d'oro best movie poster - The Sheltering Sky  "I premi del cinema"
 1992 Jupiter Award best movie poster - Dances with Wolves "Filmplakat: Der mit dem Wolf tanzt (1990)"

References

External links

Interviews
 An interview with Renato Casaro
 Renato Casaro (Italian Poster Artist: Escape From New York)

1935 births
Living people
Film poster artists
Italian illustrators
People from Treviso
Italian poster artists